Gesellschaft mit beschränkter Haftung , abbreviated GmbH  in Germany and as Ges.m.b.H. in Austria, means "company with limited liability". This is a common type of legal entity in both countries as well as in Switzerland, where it is equivalent to a société à responsabilité limitée, and Liechtenstein. 

It is an entity broadly equivalent to the private limited company in the United Kingdom and many Commonwealth countries, and the limited liability company (LLC) in the United States. The name of the GmbH form emphasizes the fact that the owners (Gesellschafter, also known as members) of the entity are not personally liable or credible for the company's debts. GmbHs are considered legal persons under German, Swiss, and Austrian law. Other variations include mbH (used when the term Gesellschaft is part of the company name itself), and gGmbH (gemeinnützige GmbH) for non-profit companies.

The GmbH has become the most common corporation form in Germany because the AG (Aktiengesellschaft), the other major company form corresponding to a stock corporation, was much more complicated to form and operate until recently.

Requirements of formation

A GmbH is formed in three stages: the founding association, which is regarded as a private partnership with full liability of the founding partners/members; the founded company (often styled as "GmbH i.G.", with "i.G." standing for in Gründung – literally "in the founding stages", with the meaning of "registration pending"); and finally the fully registered GmbH. Only the registration of the company in the Commercial Register (Handelsregister) provides the GmbH with its full legal status.

The founding act and the articles of association have to be notarized, as well as a number of business transactions, such as transfer of shares, issuing of stock, and amendments to the articles of association. Many of those measures have to be filed with the company registry where they are checked by special judges or other judicial officers. This can be a tiresome and time-consuming process, as in most cases the desired measures are legally valid only when entered into the registry. The founding process is expensive. Normally the foundation of a new GmbH cost about €1000 - €3000. The GmbH law outlines the minimum content of the articles of association, but it is quite common to have a wide range of additional rules in the articles.

Under German law, the GmbH must have a minimum founding capital of €25,000 (§ 5 I GmbHG), from which €12,500 have to be raised before registering in the commercial register (§ 7 II GmbHG). A supervisory board (Aufsichtsrat) is required if the company has more than 500 employees, otherwise, the company is run only by the managing directors (Geschäftsführer) who have the unrestricted proxy for the company. The members acting collectively may restrict the powers of the managing directors by giving them binding orders. In most cases, the articles of the association list the business activities for which the directors obtain prior consent from the members. Under German law, a violation of these duties by a managing director will not affect the validity of a contract with a third party, but the GmbH may hold the managing director in question liable for damages.

Germany, Austria, Switzerland, and Liechtenstein have different national requirements as follows:

History
The concept of a limited liability company existed in the United Kingdom prior to German speaking countries.
In 1892, the laws governing the GmbH were adopted in Germany, and in Austria in 1906. 
In the 19th century a legal entity with liability limited to the contributed capital was regarded as something dangerous. Hence, German law has many restrictions unknown to common law systems.

Because there is no central company registry in Germany but rather several hundred connected to regional courts, administration of the law can be rather different between German states. Since 2007, there has been an internet-based central company register for Germany, called the Unternehmensregister.

In 2008, a derivate form called Unternehmergesellschaft (haftungsbeschränkt) (English: "entrepreneurial company (limited liability)") or short  UG (haftungsbeschränkt) was introduced. It does not require a minimum founding capital and was introduced to assist company founders in setting up a new company. Also, the UG must enlarge its capital by at least 25% of its annual net profit (with some adjustments), until the general minimum of €25,000 is reached (at which point the company may change its name for the more prestigious GmbH). In this case, the word haftungsbeschränkt must not be abbreviated.

Gemeinnützige Gesellschaft mit beschränkter Haftung
A gemeinnützige Gesellschaft mit beschränkter Haftung (gGmbH) is a special form of a limited liability company with a charitable purpose. Traditional foundations and gGmbHs in Germany do not have minimum annual giving requirements. They are required to spend any profits by the end of the fiscal year it was accrued, and are allowed to build capital reserves totaling 10 percent of annual donations or 33 percent of dividends received.

See also
 Aktiengesellschaft (AG)
 Besloten vennootschap (bv) (Netherlands)
 Besloten vennootschap met beperkte aansprakelijkheid (bvba) (Belgium)
 Business organizations
 Corporation
 Kommanditgesellschaft auf Aktien (KGaA)
 Limited liability company
 Private limited company
 Società a responsabilità limitata (Srl) (Italy)
 Société à responsabilité limitée (Sarl) (Francophone Europe)
 Spółka z ograniczoną odpowiedzialnością (sp. z o.o.) (Poland)
 Yūgen gaisha (Japan)

References

Further reading
 
 
 Tiede/Ryczewski, "Introduction to the Serbian Law on Limited Liability Companies" in WiRO 2012 (German Law Journal), vol. 5, pp. 140–144

External links
 Anpartsselskab 

Types of business entity
German business law
Law of Liechtenstein
Law of Austria
Law of Switzerland

de:Gesellschaft mit beschränkter Haftung